Elizabeth Madden Honey (born 7 February 1947) is an Australian children's author, illustrator and poet, best known for her picture books and middle-grade novels. Her books have been published internationally. She lives in 
Richmond, Melbourne.

In 1997, she won the Children's Book of the Year Award: Picture Book for Not a Nibble. She also received the Prize Cento and the Young Australians Best Book Award (YABBA) for 45 & 47 Stella Street and everything that Happened. In 2001, she was the recipient of the Australian Wilderness Society Environment Award for Children's Literature.

Life and career

Honey was born in the coal mining town of Wonthaggi in Gippsland, Victoria. She grew up on a dairy farm, the third in a family of four. A sickly child she became an avid reader. After the family moved to a farm near Geelong she attended high school at Morongo Girls' College. 

In Melbourne, Honey studied art at Swinburne Technical College, where she was in the second intake at Australia’s first film school.

‘The predominate traits shared by the students were artistic talent, youth and high spirits, and boundless confidence and optimism. It was the ‘Swinging Sixties’ after all and art students were in the vanguard of taste, fashion and ideas…’ 

The mix of characters and talents at Swinburne had a profound influence on Honey, and the unstructured nature of the course which gave students the licence to experiment. They absorbed films from around the world at the Melbourne Film Festival and staged the student revues ‘Braindrops’ and ‘68mm’.

‘They eat, sleep and drink the revue, with an intensity that is almost alarming.’

Laurie Pendlebury, Head of Swinburne Art School

Honey worked briefly at the ABC Channel 2, then in film, The Naked Bunyip and The Adventures of Barry McKenzie, advertising at W J Haysom then George Patterson, followed by extensive travel. 
Honey began work as a freelance illustrator, her commissions including drawings for newspapers, The Age and The Sydney Morning Herald, and stamps for Australia Post. 
From 1976 to 1986 she published a calendar of illustrations, but found children's book illustration the most rewarding work. In 1988, Princess Beatrice and the Rotten Robber was published, her first book as both author and illustrator. Publisher, Rosalind Price at Allen and Unwin encouraged her work and ‘she has since become an iconic voice in Australian children's literature, going on to write and illustrate a breadth of award-winning children's novels, poetry collections, as well as picture books for children of all ages. She is known for writing that is "characteristically humorous and inventive, and features outspoken characters”.

Honey draws on family life, evident in her first poetry book Honey Sandwich.

Looking for my sandals. 

Looking for my hat.

I spend all my life 

doing that. 

In 1995 her first novel 45 + 47 Stella Street and everything that happened was published. It was translated into many languages and became the first in a series, the most recent From Stella Street to Amsterdam, was published in 2020, twenty five years after the first book.

Works

Picture books

Princess Beatrice and the Rotten Robber (1988)
The Cherry Dress (1993)
Not a Nibble! (1996)
The Moon in the Man (2003)
I'm Still Awake, Still! (2008)
That's not a Daffodil! (2011)
Ten Blue Wrens: And What a Lot of Wattle! (2011)
Hop Up! Wriggle Over! (2015)

Poetry

Honey Sandwich (1993)
Mongrel Doggerel (1998)
The Moon in the Man (2003)

Novels

Don't Pat the Wombat!, illustrated by Gig Clarke (1996)
What Do You Think, Feezal? (1997)
Remote Man (2000)

Stella Street series

45 + 47 Stella Street and Everything that Happened (1995)
Fiddle-back (1998)
The Ballad of Cauldron Bay (2004)
To the Boy in Berlin with Heike Brandt (2007)
From Stella Street to Amsterdam (2020)

Activity books

The Book of Little Books (1994)

Collaborations

Energy for Kids with Gilbert Tippett (1986)
Trees for Kids with Ian Edwards (1998)
To the Boy in Berlin with Heike Brandt (2007)
Our Island with the children of Gununa, Mornington Island, and Alison Lester (2014)
I'm Still Awake, Still! with composer Sue Johnson (2008)

Works as illustrator

 S.C.A.B., by Manny Clarke (1975)
 The Twenty-Seventh Annual African Hippopotamus Race, by Morris Lurie (1977)
 Puzzles Galore!, by Meryl Brown Tobin (1978)
 Snakes Alive!, by Maureen Stewart (1978)
 So What's New?, by Bettina Bird (1978)
 Gone Children, by Phyllis Harry (1978)
 Gino and Dan, by Carolyn Marrone (1979)
 Us Three Kids, by Bettina Bird (1979)
 Call It Quits, by Bettina Bird (1979)
 Fame and Misfortune, by John Jones (1979)
 Feel, Value, Act, by Laurie Brady (1979)
 Growing things: Nature Study Ideas for the Primary School, by Brian McKinlay (1979)
 Mexican Beans, by L. M. Napier (1980)
 All Change at the Station, by Susan Burke (1980)
 Barney, Boofer, and the Cricket Bat, by Judith Worthy (1980)
 More Puzzles Galore!, by Meryl Brown Tobin (1980)
 Themes through the Year, by Cathy Hope (1981)
 The Tucker Book, by Jessie Apted (1981)
 Salt River Times, by William Mayne (1982)
 Flora's Treasures, by Ted Greenwood (1982)
 Brave with Ben, by Christobel Mattingley (1982)
 History Alive: Introducing Children to History around Them, by Brian McKinlay (1983)
 Melissa's Ghost, by Michael Dugan (poet) (1986)
 Boiler at Breakfast Creek, by Roger Vaughan Carr (1986)
 The Prize, by Helen Higgs (1986)
 I Don't Want to Know: Towards a Healthy Adolescence, by Ted Greenwood (1986)
 Outdoors for Kids, by Brian McKinlay (1987)
 Oh No! Not Again, by Linda Allen (1989)
 Dream Time: New Stories by Sixteen Award-Winning Authors, edited by Toss Gascoigne, Jo Goodman and Margot Terrell (1991)
 No Gun for Asmir, by Christobel Mattingley (1993)
 Asmir in Vienna, by Christobel Mattingley (1995)

Theatre

Mr Bleak and the Etryop premiered at the Melbourne Comedy Festival (2007). It told the story of confused Mr Bleak, who in his drive for productivity, discovers poetry after the intervention of exuberant schoolchildren. The play toured Victoria in 2008.

A musical theatre production of I'm Still Awake, Still!, inspired by the songs by Honey and Sue Johnson, directed by Jessica Wilson, premiered at the Melbourne Arts Centre in 2011, and toured the US and Australia in 2014. The Age review noted "..the clever blend of comedy and song, which celebrates in the zaniest possible way the playfulness of children, while giving them a rather sophisticated glimpse into the world of music."

A theatrical adaptation of That's not a Daffodil, adapted from the book by Honey with Görkem Acaroglu premiered in Melbourne in 2015, before going on to tour Victoria in 2017. It tells the story of a young boy who is given a daffodil bulb by the old Turkish gardener next door.

Awards and honours
1994
 Children's Book of the Year Award: Younger Readers, Honour Book for Honey Sandwich

1996
 Children's Book of the Year Award: Younger Readers, Honour Book for 45 & 47 Stella Street and everything that happened
 Adelaide Festival Awards for Literature, National Children's Literature Award shortlist for 45 & 47 Stella Street and everything that happened

1997
 Children's Book of the Year Award: Picture Book for Not a Nibble
 Prize Cento for Children's Literature (Italy) for 45 & 47 Stella Street and everything that happened
 Young Australians Best Book Awards (YABBA) Victoria: Children's Choice Award – Fiction for Older Readers for 45 & 47 Stella Street and everything that happened
 Children's Book of the Year Award: Younger Readers, Honour Book for Don't Pat The Wombat!
 Children Reading Outstanding Writers (CROW) South Australia: Children's Choice Award – years 3–5 for Don't Pat The Wombat!

1998
 COOL Award, Fiction for Older Readers shortlist for 45 & 47 Stella Street and everything that happened
 COOL Award, Fiction for Older Readers shortlist for Don't Pat The Wombat!

1999
 Kids Own Australian Literature Awards (KOALA) New South Wales: Children's Choice Award finalist for Not a Nibble and 45 & 47 Stella Street and everything that happened
 New South Wales Premier's Literary Awards shortlist for What do you think, Feezal?

2000
 Kids Own Australian Literature Awards (KOALA) New South Wales: Children's Choice Award finalist for Not a Nibble
 Young Australians Best Book Awards (YABBA) Victoria: Children's Choice Awards shortlist for Honey Sandwich
 Kids Own Australian Literature Awards (KOALA) New South Wales: Children's Choice Award finalist for 45 & 47 Stella Street and everything that happened
 West Australian Young Readers' Book Award (WAYRBA), shortlist for Fiddle-back
 Kids Own Australian Literature Awards (KOALA) New South Wales: Children's Choice Award shortlist for Don't Pat The Wombat!
 Adelaide Festival Awards for Literature, National Children's Literature Award shortlist for What do you think, Feezal?

2001
 The Wilderness Society (Australia) Environment Award for Children's Literature for Remote Man
 Young Australians Best Book Awards (YABBA) Victoria: Children's Choice Awards shortlist for Don't Pat The Wombat!
 West Australian Young Readers' Book Award (WAYRBA), shortlist for What do you think, Feezal?

2002
 West Australian Young Readers' Book Award (WAYRBA), shortlist for Remote Man

2003
 Children's Book of the Year Award: Early Childhood, Notable Book for The Moon in the Man
 APRA Music Awards of 2003: Most Performed Jazz Work, Nominated with Susan Johnson and Coco's Lunch for "All the Wild Wonders", a poem adapted to song from The Moon in the Man
 Deutscher Jugendliteraturpreis (German Youth Literature Prize): Kinderbuch (Children's book) section shortlist for Remote Man, German title: Salamander I'm Netz
 Selection to the New York Public Library Books for the Teen Age List for Remote Man

2005
 Children's Book of the Year Award: Younger Readers, Notable Book for The Ballad of Cauldron Bay
 Australian Psychological Society: Children's Peace Literature Award, shortlist for The Ballad of Cauldron Bay

2008
 Australian Publishers Design Awards: Best Designed Book for Young Adults for To the Boy in Berlin with Heike Brandt
 Selection to The White Ravens Catalog of the International Youth Library in Munich, for To the Boy in Berlin with Heike Brandt

2009
 Speech Pathology Australia Book of the Year Award: Young Children's shortlist for I'm still awake, still!
 West Australian Young Readers' Book Award (WAYRBA), shortlist for To the Boy in Berlin with Heike Brandt

2012
 Children's Book of the Year Award: Early Childhood, Honour Book for That's not a daffodil!
 Children's Book of the Year Award: Early Childhood, Notable Book for Ten Blue Wrens and what a lot of wattle!
 Prime Minister's Literary Awards: Children's Fiction, shortlist for Ten Blue Wrens and what a lot of wattle!
 Speech Pathology Australia Book of the Year Award: Young Children's shortlist for Ten Blue Wrens and what a lot of wattle!
 Queensland Premier's Literary Awards: Best Children's Book, shortlist for Ten Blue Wrens and what a lot of wattle!

References 
Notes

Sources

1947 births
Living people
Poets from Melbourne
20th-century Australian novelists
20th-century Australian women writers
21st-century Australian novelists
21st-century Australian women writers
Australian children's book illustrators
Australian children's writers
Australian women poets
Australian women children's writers
Australian women illustrators
Women writers of young adult literature
Writers who illustrated their own writing
People from Wonthaggi